Love Is Best is the second 'Best of' compilation album to be released by Ai Otsuka on 11 November 2009. Its theme is love. It will come in both a CD-only format and a CD+DVD format. Fifteen songs are included. The first press edition comes with a pair of eyeglasses called "Love Eyes".

The majority of the songs are taken from Otsuka's past releases, and they are all love songs, keeping with the album's theme. Some songs have been re-recorded specifically for the compilation.

A new song, "Is", was used to promote the album. It was used in TV commercials for Topvalu Heatfact, a company that produces underwear.

Love Is Best was certified Gold by RIAJ for shipment of 100,000 copies.

Track listing 
 "Is"
 "Aisu×Time" (Collaboration with Su from Rip Slyme)
 "Daisuki da yo." (大好きだよ。, I Love You.)
 "Ticket (チケット)"
 "Kimi Fechi" (君フェチ, Fetish of You)
 "Heart"
 "Futatsuboshi Kinenbi: Shinkon Hiyori" (ふたつ星記念日 ～新婚日和～, Two Stars Remembrance Day: Wedding Day)"
 "Sakuranbo" (さくらんぼ, Cherry)
 "Strawberry Jam"
 "Drop."
 "Amaenbo: Wedding" (甘えんぼ ～Wedding～, Spoiled Child)
 "Kimi ni Kaeru." (キミにカエル。, Returning To You.)
 "Amai Kimochi Maru Kajiri" (甘い気持ちまるかじり, A Bite Full of Sweet Feelings)
 "Renai Shashin: Haru" (恋愛写真 -春-, Love Photograph -Spring-)
 "Pocket: Last Love Letter" (ポケット ～Last Love Letter～, Pocket)

DVD track list 
 Is (Music Clip)
 Aisu×Time (Music Clip)
 Daisuki da yo. (Music Clip)
 Heart (Music Clip)
 Sakuranbo (Music Clip)
 Amaenbo: Wedding (Music Clip)

Chart history

Oricon Sales Chart

References

Ai Otsuka albums
2009 compilation albums
Avex Group compilation albums